The First Parish Congregational Church is a historic church at 116 Main Street in Yarmouth, Maine.  The congregation was established in 1730, as the ninth church founded in what is now Maine.  The current Italianate meeting house was constructed in 1867–68, and is an important surviving design of Portland architect George M. Harding. The building was added to the National Register of Historic Places in 1995.  The present congregation is affiliated with the United Church of Christ.

Description and history
Yarmouth's First Parish Congregational Church is located to the east of the town center, on the south side of Main Street (Maine State Route 115).  It is a tall single-story wood-frame structure, with a gabled roof, an exterior sheathed in clapboard and flushboarded siding, and a granite foundation.   A square tower projects slightly from the front, with a gabled entry vestibule projecting further in front of it.  The entry consists of a pair of doorways, each flanked by thin composite columns and set in round-arch openings.  A larger three-part round-arch window stands above them, with a banded frieze along the raking gable edge of the vestibule.  The tower has four stages, and is elaborately decorated, with an open belfry and an octagonal spire.

In 1818, they moved to a new building, known as the Old Sloop, across the street from its current location. That building was turned into a public hall after the congregation moved out in 1868, and was demolished in 1879. The cost of the new church was $35,000.

The church was designed for the congregation by Portland architect George M. Harding, one of Maine's leading architects of the mid-19th century.  It is one of only three church designs of his to survive in the state.

See also
National Register of Historic Places listings in Cumberland County, Maine

References

External links
Official website

Churches in Yarmouth, Maine
Churches on the National Register of Historic Places in Maine
Italianate architecture in Maine
Churches completed in 1867
19th-century churches in the United States
National Register of Historic Places in Cumberland County, Maine
Italianate church buildings in the United States